Emme Fahu Dhuvas is a 1997 Maldivian drama film directed by Easa Shareef. Produced by Seven Private Limited, the film stars Reeko Moosa Manik, Hassan Afeef, Niuma Mohamed and Mariyam Nazima in pivotal roles.

Premise
Haseena (Mariyam Nazima) who is engaged to B. Eydhafushi sport's club secretary Atheef, (Reeko Moosa Manik) relocates to Male' in order to master the skills of handicraft and fashion designing before the marriage. During her stay in Male', Shahid is smitten by Haseena's beauty. Shahid's best-friend Azeeza (Niuma Mohamed), ploys to sunder Haseena and Atheef by creating a misleading impression regarding the relationship between Atheef and his secretary while Atheef is being told that Haseena is having an affair with her teacher, Ali Nafees (Ibrahim Rasheed).

Cast 
 Reeko Moosa Manik as Atheef
 Hassan Afeef as Shahid
 Niuma Mohamed as Azeeza
 Mariyam Nazima as Haseena
 Fauziyya Hassan as Nasheedha; Shahid's mother
 Satthar Ibrahim Manik as Atheef's father
 Mariyam Haleem as Khadheeja; Haseena's mother
 Zarana
 Ali Abdulla as Hameed (Special appearance)
 Sithi Fulhu as an aspiring actress (Special appearance)
 Ibrahim Rasheed as Ali Nafees (Special appearance)
 Haajara Abdul Kareem as Azeeza's mother (Special appearance)

Soundtrack

References

Maldivian drama films
1997 films
Films directed by Easa Shareef
1997 drama films
Dhivehi-language films